Unified Video Decoder (UVD, previously called Universal Video Decoder) is the name given to AMD's dedicated video decoding ASIC. There are multiple versions implementing a multitude of video codecs, such as H.264 and VC-1.

UVD was introduced with the Radeon HD 2000 Series and is integrated into some of AMD's GPUs and APUs. UVD occupies a considerable amount of the die surface at the time of its introduction and is not to be confused with AMD's Video Coding Engine (VCE).

As of AMD Raven Ridge (released January 2018), UVD and VCE were succeeded by Video Core Next (VCN).

Overview
The UVD is based on an ATI Xilleon video processor, which is incorporated onto the same die as the GPU and is part of the ATI Avivo HD for hardware video decoding, along with the Advanced Video Processor (AVP). UVD, as stated by AMD, handles decoding of H.264/AVC, and VC-1 video codecs entirely in hardware.

The UVD technology is based on the Cadence Tensilica Xtensa processor, which was originally licensed by ATI Technologies Inc. in 2004.

UVD/UVD+
In early versions of UVD, video post-processing is passed to the pixel shaders and OpenCL kernels. MPEG-2 decoding is not performed within UVD, but in the shader processors. The decoder meets the performance and profile requirements of Blu-ray and HD DVD, decoding H.264 bitstreams up to a bitrate of 40 Mbit/s. It has context-adaptive binary arithmetic coding (CABAC) support for H.264/AVC.

Unlike video acceleration blocks in previous generation GPUs, which demanded considerable host-CPU involvement, UVD offloads the entire video-decoder process for VC-1 and H.264 except for video post-processing, which is offloaded to the shaders. MPEG-2 decode is also supported, but the bitstream/entropy decode is not performed for MPEG-2 video in hardware.

Previously, neither ATI Radeon R520 series' ATI Avivo nor NVidia Geforce 7 series' PureVideo assisted front-end bitstream/entropy decompression in VC-1 and H.264 - the host CPU performed this work. UVD handles VLC/CAVLC/CABAC, frequency transform, pixel prediction and inloop deblocking, but passes the post processing to the shaders. Post-processing includes denoising, de-interlacing, and scaling/resizing. AMD has also stated that the UVD component being incorporated into the GPU core only occupies 4.7 mm² in area on 65 nm fabrication process node.

A variation on UVD, called UVD+, was introduced with the Radeon HD 3000 series. UVD+ support HDCP for higher resolution video streams. But UVD+ was also being marketed as simply UVD.

UVD 2
The UVD saw a refresh with the release of the Radeon HD 4000 series products. The UVD 2 features full bitstream decoding of H.264/MPEG-4 AVC, VC-1, as well as iDCT level acceleration of MPEG2 video streams. Performance improvements allow dual video stream decoding and Picture-in-Picture mode. This makes UVD2 full BD-Live compliant.

The UVD 2.2 features a re-designed local memory interface and enhances the compatibility with MPEG2/H.264/VC-1 videos. However, it was marketed under the same alias as "UVD 2 Enhanced" as the "special core-logic, available in RV770 and RV730 series of GPUs, for hardware decoding of MPEG2, H.264 and VC-1 video with dual-stream decoding". The nature of UVD 2.2 being an incremental update to the UVD 2 can be accounted for this move.

UVD 3
UVD 3 adds support for additional hardware MPEG2 decoding (entropy decode), DivX and Xvid via MPEG-4 Part 2 decoding (entropy decode, inverse transform, motion compensation) and Blu-ray 3D via MVC (entropy decode, inverse transform, motion compensation, in-loop deblocking). along with 120 Hz stereo 3D support, and is optimized to utilize less CPU processing power.
UVD 3 also adds support for Blu-ray 3D stereoscopic displays.

UVD 4
UVD 4 includes improved frame interpolation with H.264 decoder. UVD 4.2 was introduced with the AMD Radeon Rx 200 series and Kaveri APU.

UVD 5
UVD 5 was introduced with the AMD Radeon R9 285. New to UVD is full support for 4K H.264 video, up to level 5.2 (4Kp60).

UVD 6
The UVD 6.0 decoder and Video Coding Engine 3.1 encoder were reported to be first used in GPUs based on GCN 3, including Radeon R9 Fury series and "Carrizo"-APUs, followed by AMD Radeon Rx 300 Series (Pirate Islands GPU family) and AMD Radeon Rx 400 Series (Arctic Islands GPU family). The UVD version in "Fiji" and "Carrizo"-based graphics controller hardware is also announced to provide support for High Efficiency Video Coding (HEVC, H.265) hardware video decoding, up to 4K, 8-bits color (H.265 version 1, main profile); and there is support for the 10bit-color HDR both H.265 and VP9 video codec in the AMD Radeon 400 series with UVD 6.3.

UVD 7
The UVD 7.0 decoder and Video Coding Engine 4.0 encoder are included in the Vega-based GPUs. But there is still no fixed function VP9 hardware decoding.

UVD 7.2
AMD's Vega20 GPU, present in the Instinct Mi50, Instinct Mi60 and Radeon VII cards, include VCE 4.1 and two UVD 7.2 instances.

VCN 1

Starting with the integrated graphics of the Raven Ridge APU (Ryzen 2200/2400G), the former UVD and VCE have been replaced by the new "Video Core Next" (VCN). VCN 1.0 adds full hardware decoding for the VP9 codec.

Format support

Availability
Most of the Radeon HD 2000 series video cards implement the UVD for hardware decoding of 1080p high definition contents. However, the Radeon HD 2900 series video cards do not include the UVD (though it is able to provide partial functionality through the use of its shaders), which was incorrectly stated to be present on the product pages and package boxes of the add-in partners' products before the launch of the Radeon HD 2900 XT, either stating the card as featuring ATI Avivo HD or explicitly UVD, which only the former statement of ATI Avivo HD is correct. The exclusion of UVD was also confirmed by AMD officials.

UVD2 is implemented in the Radeon RV7x0 and R7x0 series GPUs. This also includes the RS7x0 series used for the AMD 700 chipset series IGP motherboards.

Feature overview

APUs

GPUs

Operating system support
The UVD SIP core needs to be supported by the device driver, which provides one or more interfaces such as VDPAU, VAAPI or DXVA. One of these interfaces is then used by end-user software, for example VLC media player or GStreamer, to access the UVD hardware and make use of it.

AMD Catalyst, AMD's proprietary graphics device driver that supports UVD, is available for Microsoft Windows and some Linux distributions. Additionally, a free device driver is available, which also supports the UVD hardware.

Linux

Support for UVD has been available in AMD's proprietary driver Catalyst version 8.10 since October 2008 through X-Video Motion Compensation (XvMC) or X-Video Bitstream Acceleration (XvBA). Since April 2013, UVD is supported by the free and open-source "radeon" device driver through Video Decode and Presentation API for Unix (VDPAU). An implementation of VDPAU is available as Gallium3D state tracker in Mesa 3D.

On 28 June 2014, Phoronix published some benchmarks on using Unified Video Decoder through the VDPAU interface running MPlayer on Ubuntu 14.04 with version 10.3-testing of Mesa 3D.

Windows
Microsoft Windows supported UVD since it was launched. UVD currently only supports DXVA (DirectX Video Acceleration) API specification for the Microsoft Windows and Xbox 360 platforms to allow video decoding to be hardware accelerated, thus the media player software also has to support DXVA to be able to utilize UVD hardware acceleration.

Others
Support for running custom FreeRTOS-based firmware on the Radeon HD 2400's UVD core (based on an Xtensa CPU), interfaced with a STM32 ARM-based board via I2C, was attempted as of January 2012.

Predecessors and Successor

Predecessors
The Video Shader and ATI Avivo are similar technologies incorporated into previous ATI products.

Successor

The UVD was succeeded by AMD Video Core Next in the Raven Ridge series of APUs released in October 2017. The VCN combines both encode (VCE) and decode (UVD).

See also

Video hardware technologies

Nvidia 

 PureVideo - Nvidia
 GeForce 256's Motion Compensation
 High-Definition Video Processor
 Video Processing Engine
 Nvidia NVENC
 Nvidia NVDEC

AMD 

 Video Core Next - AMD
 Video Coding Engine - AMD
 Unified Video Decoder - AMD
 Video Shader - ATI

Intel 

 Quick Sync Video - Intel
 Clear Video - Intel

Qualcomm 

 Qualcomm Hexagon

Others 

VDPAU Video Decode and Presentation API for Unix, from NVIDIA
 Video Acceleration API (VA API) an alternative video acceleration API to XvBA for Linux/UNIX operating-system that supports XvBA as a backend
 X-Video Bitstream Acceleration (XvBA) AMD's future hardware acceleration API for Linux/UNIX operating-system.
Bit stream decoder (BSD)
 Comparison of AMD graphics processing units
 DirectX Video Acceleration (DxVA) Microsoft's hardware acceleration API for Microsoft Windows based operating-system.

Notes

References

External links
 ATI Avivo HD Technology Brief, July 2008
 AMD Video Technologies, October 2010
 Presentation slides comparison between CPU decode, ATI Avivo HD and PureVideo HD and Decode comparison of VC-1 and H.264 video
 AMD Media Codecs (an optional download)

ATI Technologies
Video acceleration
AMD IP cores
Video compression and decompression ASIC